Sukda Songsang (born 24 October 1941) is a Thai boxer. He competed in the men's welterweight event at the 1964 Summer Olympics.

References

1941 births
Living people
Sukda Songsang
Sukda Songsang
Boxers at the 1964 Summer Olympics
Place of birth missing (living people)
Asian Games medalists in boxing
Boxers at the 1962 Asian Games
Boxers at the 1966 Asian Games
Sukda Songsang
Medalists at the 1962 Asian Games
Medalists at the 1966 Asian Games
Welterweight boxers